Events from the year 1661 in art.

Events
 April 19 - Philip IV of Spain appoints Juan Bautista Martínez del Mazo to succeed his late father-in-law Diego Velázquez as court painter (Pintor de cámara) in Madrid.
 October - The newly-restored King Charles II of England appoints Peter Lely as court painter.

Paintings

Filippo Abbiati - Coriolanus Persuaded By His Family To Raise the Siege of Rome
Gerrit Dou - Old Lady with a Candle
Gabriël Metsu
Lovers at Breakfast
The Visit to the Nursery, after the birth of Sara Hinlopen (1660)
Reinier Nooms - Ships on the IJ at Amsterdam
Rembrandt
St. Matthew and the Angel
Saint James The Elder
Jan van Kessel, senior - Allegory of Air
Jan Vermeer - View of Delft
John Michael Wright - Charles II in Coronation Robes

Births
February 24 - Alexandre-François Desportes, French painter and decorative designer who specialised in animal works (died 1743)
March - Lucas de Valdés, Spanish painter and engraver (died 1724)
April 6 - Stefano Maria Legnani, Italian painter, active mainly in Milan (died 1713)
April 11 - Antoine Coypel, French painter (died 1722)
June 1 - Gaspard Rigaud, French painter and portraitist (died 1705)
June 29 - Peter Van Dievoet, Belgian sculptor and designer of ornamental architectural features (died 1729)
date unknown
Scipione Angelini, Italian painter best known for still lifes (died 1729)
Benoît Audran the Elder, French engraver (died 1721)
Nunzio Ferraiuoli, Italian painter (died 1735)
Giacinto Garofalini, Italian painter (died 1723)
Claude Charles, French historical and decorative painter (died 1747)
Simon Gribelin, French line engraver (died 1733)
Jacob Leyssens, Flemish painter and decorator from the Baroque (died 1710)
Domenico Maria Muratori, Bolognese (Italian) painter (died 1744)
Thomas Quellinus, Flemish sculptor (died 1709)
Ezaias Terwesten, Dutch painter (died 1724)
Ignaz Waibl,  Austrian woodcarver (died 1733)
probable - Alida Withoos, Dutch botanical artist and painter (died 1730)

Deaths
January 29 - Bartolomeo Gennari, Italian Renaissance painter (born 1594)
March 23 - Pieter de Molijn, Dutch Golden Age painter and engraver born in England (born 1595)
March 25 - Jan van Aken, Dutch Golden Age painter and engraver (born 1614)
May 14 - Ilario Casolano, Italian painter (born 1588)
June 21 - Andrea Sacchi, Italian painter of High Baroque Classicism (born 1599)
August - Gerard Houckgeest, Dutch Delft School painter (born 1600)
August 5 (bur.) - Cornelis Janssens van Ceulen, Dutch portrait painter (born 1593)
September 11 - Jan Fyt, Flemish animal painter and etcher (born 1611)
September 16 (bur.) – Cornelis Vroom, Dutch painter (born 1591), known for landscapes and seascapes, son of reverse-named Hendrick Cornelisz Vroom (1566–1640)
October 25 - Lucas de Wael, Flemish painter active mainly in Genoa (born 1591)
October 28 - Ottavio Amigoni, Italian painter, active in Brescia (born 1606)
November 2 - Daniel Seghers, Flemish Jesuit brother and painter who specialized in flower still lifes (born 1590)
November 11 - David Ryckaert III, Flemish painter, member of the Ryckaert family of artists (born 1612)
date unknown
Willem Outgertsz Akersloot, Dutch Golden Age engraver (born 1600)
Cecco Bravo,  Florentine painter of the Baroque period (born 1601)
Francesco Curradi, Italian painter of the style described as Counter-Maniera or Counter-Mannerism (born 1570)
Simon Luttichuys, Dutch painter (born 1610)
Flaminio Torre, Italian Baroque painter of churches in Bologna (born 1620)
Jan Gerritsz van Bronckhorst, Dutch painter and engraver (born 1603)
probable
Frederik Bouttats, Flemish engraver (born 1620)
Jacob Peter Gowy, Flemish painter of The Flight of Icarus (born 1615)
Anton Francesco Lucini,  Italian engraver and printmaker (born 1610)
Anthonie Jansz. van der Croos, Dutch painter (born 1606)

References

 
Years of the 17th century in art
1660s in art